Augusto Cabrita (March 16, 1923 – February 1, 1993) was a Portuguese photographer, cinematographer and film director. He is best known as a leading name in photography in Portugal.

Career
Cabrita was a self-taught photographer. He worked as a photojournalist for the weekly O Século and their magazine O Século Ilustrado, from Lisbon. He also did the covers of albums by musicians like Amália Rodrigues, Carlos Paredes, Luís Goes and Simone de Oliveira. He directed many short film documentaries and was the cinematographer of Belarmino (1964), by Fernando Lopes, one of the first and most important films of the Portuguese Cinema Novo (New Cinema).

He was the photographer of several books about Portuguese patrimony, on subjects like cuisine, Portuguese religious architecture, castles and natural parks and reservations.

Cabrita name was given to a secondary school and to the municipal auditorium in his home city of Barreiro.

Filmography

Short films
(selection)
 Improviso Sobre o Algarve (1960)
 Macau (1961)
 Viana e o Seu Termo (1969)
 Na Corrente (1970)
 A Viagem (1970)
 O Mar Transporta a Cidade (1977)
 Uma História de Comboios - Uma Viagem de Hans-Christian Andersen (1978)
 Lisboa (1979)
 Açores, Ilhas do Atlântico (1979)

Books
 50 Anos da CUF no Barreiro (1958-1959)
 Portugal, Um País que Importa Conhecer (1972)
 Cozinha Tradicional Portuguesa (1982), by Maria de Lurdes Modesto, with António Homem Cardoso
 "New You Rhapsody"(1983) with Guta de Carvalho
 As Mais Belas Vilas e Aldeias de Portugal (1984), by Júlio Gil
 Os Mais Belos Castelos e Fortalezas de Portugal (1986), by Júlio Gil
 Parques e Reservas Naturais de Portugal (1990), by Pedro de Castro Henriques, with additional photography by Rui Cunha
 Amália: Uma Estranha Forma de Vida (1992), by Vítor Pavão dos Santos
 Os Mais Belos Rios de Portugal (1994), by João Conde Veiga

References

External links
 
Recordar o Mestre Augusto Cabrita Colocar o Barreiro na "rota mundial da fotografia, Rostos.pt (Portuguese)

1923 births
1993 deaths
Portuguese cinematographers
Portuguese film directors
Portuguese photographers